Ramat Beit HaKerem (lit. Beit HaKerem Heights) is a Jewish neighborhood in Jerusalem. It was established in 1991 on a hill between Beit HaKerem to the north, the Givat Ram campus of the Hebrew University to the east, and Bayit VeGan to the southwest.

History
In 1951, Israel Military Industries built a munitions factory on some of the land that became Ramat Beit HaKerem. It closed down in 1997, but environmental groups say the ground is polluted with toxic chemicals despite clean-up attempts. Ramat Beit HaKerem, Beit HaKerem, Givat Beit HaKerem, and Yefeh Nof neighborhoods are sometimes considered one "ultra neighborhood" called "Beit HaKerem Rabati" (lit. Greater Beit HaKerem). The master plan for the neighborhood includes 2,500 apartments.

See also
Jerusalem College of Engineering

References

Neighbourhoods of Jerusalem